Miklós Meszéna (14 December 1940 – 29 July 1995) was a Hungarian fencer. He won a bronze medal in the team sabre event at the 1968 Summer Olympics. At the 1964 Summer Olympics, he finished in fifth place.

References

External links
 

1940 births
1995 deaths
Hungarian male sabre fencers
Olympic fencers of Hungary
Fencers at the 1964 Summer Olympics
Fencers at the 1968 Summer Olympics
Olympic bronze medalists for Hungary
Olympic medalists in fencing
Fencers from Budapest
Medalists at the 1968 Summer Olympics
Universiade medalists in fencing
Universiade gold medalists for Hungary
Medalists at the 1965 Summer Universiade
20th-century Hungarian people